Georges Gaudy (1872–1940) was a Belgian poster artist, painter and champion cyclist.

Gaudy's first poster was commissioned for the Brussels Velodrome and many of his works featured bicycle and car manufacturers.

References

External links
 

1872 births
1940 deaths
Belgian male cyclists
People from Saint-Josse-ten-Noode
20th-century Belgian painters
19th-century Belgian painters
19th-century Belgian male artists
20th-century Belgian male artists
Art Nouveau artists